David Alec Webb (6 March 1931 – 30 June 2012) was a British actor and anti-censorship campaigner.

Early life
Webb was born in Luton, the second child and only son of Alec Webb, and attended Luton Grammar School from 1942 to 1950. He completed his National Service from 1950 to 1952, and trained at the Royal Academy of Dramatic Art from 1952 to 1954.

Career
In 1954 he joined the York Repertory Company, in 1955 the Bromley Repertory Company, and from 1955 to 1956 he toured in the play Love From Judy. He worked in television from the late 1950s onwards appearing in scores of programmes including Emergency Ward 10, Dixon of Dock Green, and Doctor Who, among many others. He featured briefly in Battle of Britain as an unnamed RAF officer.

NCROPA
In April 1976, he set up the anti-censorship pressure group, the National Campaign for the Repeal of the 1959 Obscene Publications Act; this was later amended to National Campaign for the Reform of the Obscene Publications Acts (NCROPA).

NCROPA was very active from its inception through the 1980s, and in 1983 Webb stood as the anti-censorship candidate against the incumbent Prime Minister Margaret Thatcher in her Finchley constituency. He was also a member of the Campaign Against Censorship. By the late 1990s, NCROPA was effectively moribund, and in December 2014, NCROPA was formally merged with the CAC.

Personal life
David Webb was unmarried. He was a secular humanist.

Death
He died at Trinity Hospice, Clapham, and was cremated at Mortlake Crematorium on 17 July 2012.

References

External links

The David Webb Virtual Archive & Fan Site
The NCROPA Virtual Archive
Libertarian Alliance documents, including unpublished material by David Webb
NCROPA archives, at the Modern Records Centre, University of Warwick

1931 births
2012 deaths
People from Luton
English male stage actors
English male television actors
English humanists
Secular humanists
Censorship in the United Kingdom
Alumni of RADA
English atheists